Our Lady of Fátima High School is a Catholic school in Aligarh, Uttar Pradesh, India, affiliated to the Central Board of Secondary Education board located at Ramghat Road, Aligarh. The principal is Sr. Jyotsana.

Our Lady of Fatima was established in 1961, and was the first English medium school in Aligarh. It is managed by Catholic missionary nuns. The school runs a program for educating underprivileged children in the evenings.

Curriculum

The academic curriculum includes Mathematics , English , Hindi and Urdu or Sanskrit as third language (in Classes VI to VIII), Social studies (history, civics, geography, economics [From IXth onwards]), Science (physics, chemistry, biology), and Art. Other subjects include computer science, moral science and physical health education.

Class 10 students are prepared for the board exams. They sit for Pre-board examination before the CBSE conduct examinations. The books are published by National Council of Educational Research and Training and Private Book Companies.
Grading system has been started from the academic year 2010–2011.

Extracurricular activities

Games and sports 
Besides the mandatory Physical Health Education class (also known as Games period), students go to school during the evening to participate in various games and sports.  Activities include Cricket, Soccer, Basketball and Volleyball .  The Students of the school are known over the years to win many awards both at the State and National level.

Intellectual skills and competitions 
Students participate in Science and General Knowledge quizzes held among the local schools. Some of the competitions are held by National Talent Search Examination and University of New South Wales competition. Other competitions are held in debating, elocution, dramatics and creative writing.

Uniform
The uniform in summer is a white shirt and navy blue trouser for boys and navy blue skirt for girls under 8th class and shalwar kameez for girls in 8th class and above, with white socks for both. Until 2000 the uniform was a white shirt with gray trousers/skirts.
The uniform in winter is white full sleeves shirt for boys and navy blue full sleeves kameez for girls in 8th class or above.  With navy blue blazer, navy blue sweater, and all the summer garments. Since 2015 the uniforms have been changed. The students from class 1 to 7 wear blue shirt and blue check skirt(girls) and blue shirt and grey pant/ shorts(boys). Class 8 to 10 have check kurta and white shalwar (girls) and same for boys.

Notable alumni 
 Annu Raj Singh, a sport shooter

See also 
 Aligarh, Uttar Pradesh
 Our Lady of Fátima

References

External links

 

Catholic secondary schools in India
Primary schools in Uttar Pradesh
High schools and secondary schools in Uttar Pradesh
Christian schools in Uttar Pradesh
Schools in Aligarh
Educational institutions established in 1961
1961 establishments in Uttar Pradesh